Berg Church may refer to several churches:

Berg Church (Halden), a church in Halden municipality, Viken county, Norway
Berg Church (Larvik), a church in Larvik municipality, Vestfold og Telemark county, Norway
Berg Church (Senja), a church in Senja municipality, Troms og Finnmark county, Norway
Berg Church (Trondheim), a church in Trondheim municipality, Trøndelag county, Norway
Old Berg Church, a historic church in Larvik municipality, Vestfold og Telemark county, Norway